In mechanical engineering, a crosshead is a mechanical joint used as part of the slider-crank linkages of long reciprocating engines (either internal combustion or steam) and reciprocating compressors to eliminate sideways force on the piston. Also, the crosshead enables the connecting rod to freely move outside the cylinder. Because of the very small bore-to-stroke ratio on such engines, the connecting rod would hit the cylinder walls and block the engine from rotating if the piston was attached directly to the connecting rod like on trunk engines. Therefore, the longitudinal dimension of the crosshead must be matched to the stroke of the engine.

Overview
On smaller engines, the connecting rod links the piston and the crankshaft directly, but this transmits sideways forces to the piston, since the crankpin (and thus the direction the force is applied) moves from side to side with the rotary motion of the crank. These transverse forces are tolerable in a smaller engine. A larger engine's much greater forces would cause an intolerable degree of wear on the piston and cylinder, as well as increasing overall friction in the engine.

A piston rod is attached to the piston and links it to the crosshead, which is a large casting sliding in crosshead guides (UK: slidebar), allowing it only to move in the same direction as the piston travel. The crosshead also houses the gudgeon pin (US: wristpin) on which the small end of the connecting rod pivots. In this way, the transverse forces are applied only to the crosshead and its bearings, not to the piston itself.

Internal combustion engines
Internal combustion engines using crossheads make for easier maintenance of the top end of the engine, since the pistons can be easily removed. The piston rod is mounted on the underside of the piston and connected to the crosshead by a single nut in double acting engines. The large two-stroke marine diesel engines are usually of this pattern. A crosshead is essential in a double-acting diesel engine (see also:  battleships: 12 MAN double-acting 2-stroke 9-cylinder diesels). Large diesels often have a plunger oilpump directly attached to the crosshead to supply oil under high pressure to the crosshead bearing.

Steam engines
In the case of the steam engine, a crosshead is essential if the engine is to be double acting - steam is applied to both sides of the piston, which requires a seal around the piston rod. An exception is the oscillating cylinder steam engine which can be double acting and yet has no crosshead.

Locomotives
Crossheads in a steam locomotive can be mounted either to one guide mounted above the crosshead or to two, one above and one below (called an alligator crosshead since it has two "jaws").  The former was preferred in many modern locomotives.

Marine engines
In many 19th century marine steam engines, the crosshead was a strong metal bar attached to the piston rod and perpendicular to it, which was sometimes used to eliminate transverse forces, as in a steeple engine, and at other times used as a linkage—to side-rods in a side-lever engine or to connecting rods in a square engine.

See also 
 Crosshead piston
    in which the lateral force of the piston is completely eliminated

References 

Engine technology
Bearings (mechanical)
Locomotive parts
Linkages (mechanical)